Albastar AS are gliders produced by the Slovenian company Albastar Ltd. They are currently in the development stage.

Albastar AS-13,5m FES

Albastar 13,5m FES is a single-seat motor glider with 13.5 m wingspan designed for FAI 13.5 m class which took its maiden flight in April 2013. To achieve better performance, the new airfoil with flaps was designed. It has provision for Ballistic Recovery System (BRS). The cockpit was designed roomy enough to be used by taller pilots.

The glider has 23 kW front electric sustainer (FES) positioned in the nose which in combination with low takeoff weight is powerful enough to be used for self-launch. This system uses folding propeller which greatly reduces aerodynamic drag when not in use. The take-off roll is 170 m with enough battery capacity to reach 1800 m AGL. However, the glider also incorporates a tow hook mounted in the center of gravity for the classic aerotow.

Two AS-13,5 gliders took part on the 2nd FAI 13.5 m World championship in Szatymaz in 2017.

Albastar AS-18

Albastar AS-18 is a two-seat motor glider with 18 m wingspan. First prototype AS-18M is powered by two-stroke internal combustion engine with the propeller mast mounted behind the cockpit. It has a self-launching capability and unlike other similar gliders, it has the unique feature of starting the engine before the propeller mast is extended, therefore practically eliminating the period of increased drag before the engine is started.

The second prototype, AS-18 GEN is powered by the more powerful version of the FES system. It uses the 42 kW electric motor which is powered by the electric generator driven by the gasoline engine mounted in the fuselage behind the cockpit.

External links
Albastar AS18 
Albastar AS13,5 
Front Electric Sustainer

References

Glider aircraft
Albastar Ltd aircraft
2010s Slovenian sailplanes
Electric aircraft